Aleksandr Igorevich Troshechkin (born 23 April 1996) is a Russian professional football player. He plays as a defensive midfielder for FC Akhmat Grozny.

Club career
He made his debut in the Russian Premier League on 17 August 2014 for FC Rostov in a game against FC Krasnodar.

After returning to FC Rostov from loan in January 2019 and playing several pre-season games for the club, on 6 February 2019 he returned to FC Avangard Kursk on another loan until the end of the 2018–19 season.

On 10 July 2019, he signed with FC Khimki.

On 17 February 2022, Troshechkin joined FC Akhmat Grozny on a contract until the end of the 2023–24 season.

Honours

Club
Tosno
 Russian Cup: 2017–18

Career statistics

References

External links
 
 
 

1996 births
Footballers from Moscow
Living people
Russian footballers
Russia under-21 international footballers
Association football midfielders
FC Anzhi Makhachkala players
FC Rostov players
FC Fakel Voronezh players
FC Tosno players
FC Avangard Kursk players
FC Khimki players
FC Akhmat Grozny players
Russian Premier League players
Russian First League players